I Must Go to the City is a 1962 West German romance film directed by Hans Deppe and starring Vico Torriani, Barbara Frey and Monika Dahlberg. Its title is a reference to the traditional German song.

It was made at the Spandau Studios in Berlin. The film's sets were designed by the art director Max Mellin.

Cast
 Vico Torriani as Clown Richie
 Barbara Frey as Heidi Hagen
 Monika Dahlberg as Eva
 Erik Schumann as Dr. Werner Koch
 Dieter Borsche as Onkel Herbert Drontheim
 Carola Höhn as Tante Carola Drontheim
 Peter Nestler as Ronald Brown
 Eduard Linkers as Bankdirektor Sieper
 Vera Complojer as Haushälterin Röschen
 Fredy Brock as Otto
 Georg Blädel as Sepp

References

Bibliography 
 Hans-Michael Bock and Tim Bergfelder. The Concise Cinegraph: An Encyclopedia of German Cinema. Berghahn Books, 2009.

External links 
 

1962 films
1960s romance films
German romance films
West German films
1960s German-language films
Films directed by Hans Deppe
Films shot at Spandau Studios
1960s German films